Cesano Maderno (Milanese: Cesaa) is a town and comune of about 39,000 inhabitants in the province of Monza and Brianza, Lombardy, northern Italy. The town borders with the towns of Seveso in the north, in the south with Bovisio-Masciago, in the east with Desio and Seregno, and in the west with Ceriano Laghetto and Cogliate. It received the honorary title of city with a presidential decree on 11 October 1999.

It is served by Cesano Maderno railway station and Cesano Maderno-Groane railway station.

Main sights

Palazzo Arese Borromeo
Palazzo Arese Jacini 
Il Torrazzo 
Palazzina Carcano Cabiate 
Ancient church of Santo Stefano

Twin towns
 Valençay, France
 Chernivtsi, Ukraine
 Campomaggiore, Italy

References

External links
Official website

Cities and towns in Lombardy